The CG634 is the Canadian Armed Forces' main combat helmet. It was introduced in 1997 and is based on the French Gallet TC-3 helmet. The helmet has protection equal to an NIJ Level 3a rating, being able to stop a shot from a .357 Magnum.

History
The Canadian military sought a replacement for the steel M1 Helmet in the 1980s. In 1984 it trialled the British Mk. 6, the American PASGT, and the Israeli OR402 composite helmets to determine the best characteristics of form, fit and ballistic protection. A concept design was developed and the Barrday Co. of Cambridge, Ontario, received a contract to produce over 2,000 Spectra helmets between 1988 and 1990 for ballistic, engineering, and user trials.  While the Barrday helmet performed well ballistically, field trials identified significant shortcomings.  

The Barrday contract was scrapped and the search for a new helmet resumed in late 1992.  After testing a number of European off-the-shelf designs the process was completed in May 1996 and a contract to produce 60,000 helmets was issued to the French company Gallet, which produced the TC-3 helmet and its variants for the French, Danish, and Austrian armies.  From 1997 to 2004 the CG634 was manufactured by Gallet Sécurité Internationale in Saint-Romuald, Quebec. Subsequent contracts were placed with MSA, which bought Gallet in 2002.

Design
The CG634 is made of aramid (Kevlar) and has a minimum  of 634 m/s (compared to the PASGT's 610 m/s).  It mates a modified French design, based on the PASGT, but adapted for compatibility with Canadian equipment (head-set, respirator, vision devices, and armoured vest).  The suspension system combines a thick foam trauma liner with a rubber and nylon webbing suspension based on the French Mle-78 (Gallet TC-3).  The CG634 has a three-point chinstrap with flip-down adjustment pieces.

The CG634 has a somewhat similar shape and is sometimes mistaken for the later United States Army's MICH TC-2000 Combat Helmet.  The MICH uses a foam padding system in its ground-combat helmet instead of webbing.  The only pad system approved for use in combat is manufactured by Team Wendy and supplied by National Industries for the Blind.  These pads may also be used with the CG634.

When necessary, a night vision goggle mount is issued. The mount consists of a green metal bracket that hooks over the front of the helmet and the mount, which is screwed into it.  There is a strap that loops through the mount and connects to a large ring, which is usually on the top of the helmet, and two more straps secure the mount to the back of the helmet.  The mount is compatible with AN/PVS-7 and AN/PVS-14 night vision systems.

Replacement
The CG634 is scheduled to be replaced with the new CM735 combat helmet from Morgan Advanced Materials, which is based on their full-cut LASA AC914 for combat operations and the high-cut LASA AC915 for special operations.  NP Aerospace was due to supply the helmet over seven years.

References

Canadian military uniforms
Combat helmets of Canada
Military equipment introduced in the 1990s